Pradeep Lall is an electrical engineer at Auburn University in Auburn, Alabama. He was named a Fellow of the Institute of Electrical and Electronics Engineers (IEEE) in 2012 for his contributions to reliability prediction for electronic packaging.

References

Fellow Members of the IEEE
Living people
Year of birth missing (living people)
Place of birth missing (living people)
Auburn University faculty
American electrical engineers